The United States national beach handball team (USA Beach Handball) is the national team of the United States. It is governed by USA Team Handball and takes part in international beach handball competitions.

Restart of the program in 2015
In May 2015, USA Team Handball officially decided to start an international beach handball program under the direction of former Olympic USA Team Handball player and coach Dennis Burkholtz. On the day the program was announced, former USA National Team player for indoor handball Mike Hinson, approached Dennis about starting a program and coaching a team based out of Southern California. Coach Hinson, having played beach handball for 14 years, knew about beach handball and believed the United States could put together a team that could compete at the highest level pretty quickly. In September 2015, USA Team Handball announced Mike Hinson as the head coach of the USA Men Beach Handball Team. Based out of Hermosa Beach California, Coach Hinson began recruiting athletes from all different athletic backgrounds. He brought in a former 2012 Olympic goalie from USA Water Polo, a Dodgeball World Champion, several current and former USA Team Handball players, a former Division 1 Quarterback, a former division 1 Basketball Center and a current collegiate Lacrosse player, among others.

In March 2016 the USA Men went down to Venezuela in their first ever competition in the new formation. The top two teams from the tournament would advance to the World Championships. The tournament featured several high level programs with experienced players. Starting the tournament off 1-3 they were in a must win against Ecuador to advance to the medal round. This is where the US team was truly born. The defense held Ecuador scoreless for the first 6 minutes of the match and defeated them in two sets. Next they faced the undefeated #1 seed and host country Venezuela who was ranked #7 in the world in the semi-finals. Splitting the sets 1-1, the US won on the last shot in shootout to advance to the gold medal game. Facing defending Pan American Championship Silver medalists Uruguay they once again split sets 1-1 and again won on the last shot in shootout to claim the Gold Medal.

By winning the Pan American Championships, the USA men team qualified into the 12 team field of the World Championships in Budapest, Hungary. Being their first World Championships the international expectations were not high for any success. In the first game of the tournament, the USA Team shocked the international handball world by defeating the #5 team in the world, Ukraine in straight sets. Needing one more win in the next 4 games to qualify into the top 6, USA fell just short against defending World Champion Brazil, lost a close game against defending bronze medalist Qatar, then lost 2 extremely tight shootouts against Egypt and Bahrain. Finishing out of the medal rounds, USA then lost a close shootout to Oman and finished the tournament with an emotional win against Australia in the rain.

After the success of the men's team in Venezuela, former assistant Coach for the men's team Juliano de Oliveira was announced head coach of the newly formed USA Women Beach Handball Team. With that announcement the women's program relocated from  Miami, Florida to Hermosa Beach to have both programs benefit from the conditions in California. By recruiting current players of the USA Team Handball Women National Team and the local Los Angeles Team Handball Club Coach Juliano formed the core of the team that would go on to compete in the 2018 Pan American Beach Handball Championship.

Results

World Championships

Pan American Championships

References

External links
Official website
IHF profile

National beach handball teams
Men's national sports teams of the United States